Fabrizio Palenzona (born in Novi Ligure,  September 1, 1953) is a company executive, banker and Italian politician, past president of ASECAP, president of Gemina, Italian Association of Motorway and Tunnel Concessionaire Companies (AISCAT), of Aeroporti di Roma (ADR), on the board of directors of Mediobanca and vice president of Unicredit.

Biography
Fabrizio Palenzona is married and has two children.

After completing his degree in Law at the University of Pavia, he began his professional career in 1981 as a member of the board of directors of Unitra carl, assuming the same position with Unitra srl in 1987.
Today, in addition to being vice-president of UniCredit, he is president of Gemina, Italian Association of Motorway and Tunnel Concessionaire Companies (AISCAT), Aeroporti di Roma (ADR), Aviva Italia and Assaeroporti, and is on the board of directors of Mediobanca, ABI and Fondazione Cassa di Risparmio di Alessandria.

Political career
He joined ACLI and later the Christian Democrats. From 1985 to 1995 he was mayor of Tortona, then in the same year he became part of the provincial council of Alessandria. After the Christian Democrats were dissolved, he joined the Daisy party and from 1995 to 2004 he was President of the Province of Alessandria.

Honours
Commander of the Order of Merit of the Italian Republic
11 June 1993.

Knight of Labour
31 May 2004

References

External links
ADR
Unicredit

1953 births
Living people
Italian businesspeople
Presidents of the Province of Alessandria
Christian Democracy (Italy) politicians
Italian People's Party (1994) politicians
Democracy is Freedom – The Daisy politicians